Jakob Puss (born 14 October 1894 Kihelkonna, Saare County) was an Estonian politician. He was a member of Estonian Constituent Assembly. He was a member of the assembly since 25 October 1919. He replaced Tõnu Talbak.

References

Members of the Estonian Constituent Assembly
1894 births
Year of death missing
Date of death missing
People from Saaremaa Parish